Glenn Lee Benner II (September 24, 1962 – February 7, 2006) was a convicted murderer, executed by the State of Ohio.

Murders
On August 6, 1985, Benner abducted 26-year-old Cynthia Sedgwick in the woods surrounding the Blossom Music Center in Summit County, where they both attended a concert. Benner raped Sedgwick and choked her to death.

On January 2, 1986, Benner kidnapped an acquaintance, 21-year-old Trina Bowser, in Akron and raped and killed her. DNA testing, conducted during federal appeals in 2003, identified Benner as the source of semen in Bowser's assault.

Trial and execution
On May 14, 1986, Benner was convicted for kidnapping, rape, and aggravated murder.  He was also convicted for the attempted murders and rapes of two other women on two separate occasions.

He spent 19 years, eight months, and 24 days on death row before being executed by lethal injection on February 7, 2006.

Benner's last meal consisted of four bacon cheeseburgers on toasted buns, with green peppers, tomatoes, pickles, ketchup, mustard and mayonnaise; a baked potato with butter and sour cream; french fries; onion rings; macaroni and cheese; chef salad with creamy Italian dressing; blueberry pie with chocolate ice cream; iced tea; and a Coke.

Benner's last words were "I just need you to give me two seconds. I have been going over and over in my head trying to think of the words I can say to you that would ease the unimaginable pain that you have been going through for 20 years because of my actions. I'm sorry. Trina and Cynthia were beautiful girls who didn't deserve what I did to them. They are in a better place. Words seem so futile. All I can say is I'm sorry. May God give you peace."

See also 
 Capital punishment in Ohio
 Capital punishment in the United States
 List of people executed in Ohio
 List of people executed in the United States in 2006

General references
Clark Prosecutor

References

External links
2005 Capital Crimes Report, Ohio Attorney General's Office (pdf)

1962 births
1985 murders in the United States
2006 deaths
20th-century American criminals
21st-century executions by Ohio
21st-century executions of American people
American kidnappers
American male criminals
American people executed for murder
American people convicted of rape
Executed people from Ohio
People convicted of murder by Ohio
People executed by Ohio by lethal injection
People from Akron, Ohio
Violence against women in the United States